Joshua Richard "Josh" Simpson (born 6 March 1987) is an English professional footballer who plays as a midfielder. He has previously played for Crawley Town, Cambridge City, Plymouth Argyle, Cambridge United, Histon, Peterborough United and Southend United.

Club career
Born in Harlow, Essex, Simpson started his career at Cambridge City in 2004. In 2006, he transferred to Cambridge United on a one-year contract, although Simpson ended-up back at "City" after just one season at The Abbey. He left Cambridge City in 2008, for the second time, and signed for neighbouring Histon.

He joined Championship team Peterborough United on loan until 31 December 2009, with a view to a permanent move, on 5 November 2009. He made his debut on 21 November as an 87th minute substitute in a 1–0 defeat against Sheffield United at Bramall Lane. He scored two goals for Peterborough in a 4–4 draw with Cardiff City, including the equalising goal on 90 minutes, after the team had been 4–0 down at half time. He signed for Peterborough permanently on a three-and-a-half-year contract for an undisclosed fee on 5 January 2010.

He revealed in May that he was under new management, Gary Johnson's plans for the forthcoming 2010–11 season, although Johnson stated in July that Simpson was not part of his plans. Following a successful pre season trial Simpson joined League Two team Southend United on an initial six-month loan on 5 August 2010.

He was recalled from his loan in late December and on 31 December joined Crawley Town for an undisclosed fee on a two and a half-year contract. He made his debut for the club the next day as an 83rd-minute substitute against Eastbourne Borough.

On 6 July 2015, Josh signed for Football League Two club Plymouth Argyle on a one-year contract. Simpson was released by Argyle at the end of the season.

In November 2017, Simpson signed for Southern League club Bishop's Stortford.

In November 2019, Simpson returned to his former club Cambridge City, making his debut against Kempston Rovers.

International career
Simpson was capped four times by England C, scoring one goal, from 2008 to 2011.

Career statistics

References

External links

1987 births
Living people
Sportspeople from Harlow
English footballers
England semi-pro international footballers
Association football midfielders
Cambridge City F.C. players
Cambridge United F.C. players
Histon F.C. players
Peterborough United F.C. players
Southend United F.C. players
Crawley Town F.C. players
Plymouth Argyle F.C. players
English Football League players
National League (English football) players
Southern Football League players